Pirsaat is a village in the Hajigabul Rayon of Azerbaijan. The village forms part of the municipality of Nəvahı.

References 

Populated places in Hajigabul District